Aliaksandr Siarheyevich Hushtyn (born 16 August 1993) is a Belarusian freestyle wrestler. He is a three-time silver medalist at the European Wrestling Championships. He represented Belarus at the 2019 European Games held in Minsk, Belarus and he won a bronze medal in the men's 97 kg event.

Career 

He competed in the boys' 76 kg event at the 2010 Summer Youth Olympics held in Singapore without winning a medal. He finished in 5th place. He competed in the men's 86 kg event at the 2015 European Games held in Baku, Azerbaijan. In the same year, he also competed in the men's 86 kg event at the 2015 World Wrestling Championships held in Las Vegas, United States where he was eliminated in his first match by Armands Zvirbulis of Latvia. A year later, he won one of the bronze medals in the men's 97 kg event at the 2016 World University Wrestling Championships held in Çorum, Turkey.

In 2017, he initially won one of the bronze medals in the 97 kg event at the European Wrestling Championships; this became a silver medal after the original winner of the silver medal, Anzor Boltukayev from Russia, was disqualified and deprived of the medal due to doping. In 2018, he did win the silver medal in the 97 kg event at the European Wrestling Championships held in Kaspiysk, Russia. He repeated this with the silver medal in the 97 kg event at the 2019 European Wrestling Championships held in Bucharest, Romania.

He represented Belarus at the 2019 Military World Games held in Wuhan, China and he won the silver medal in the 97 kg event. In the final, he lost against Mohammad Hossein Mohammadian of Iran. In 2020, he won the silver medal in the men's 97 kg event at the Individual Wrestling World Cup held in Belgrade, Serbia. In the final, he lost against Abdulrashid Sadulaev of Russia. In March 2021, he qualified at the European Qualification Tournament to compete at the 2020 Summer Olympics in Tokyo, Japan. He was eliminated in his first match in the men's 97 kg event.

Two months after the Olympics, he lost his bronze medal match in the men's 97 kg event at the 2021 World Wrestling Championships held in Oslo, Norway.

Major results

References

External links 

 

Living people
1993 births
People from Svislach
Belarusian male sport wrestlers
Wrestlers at the 2010 Summer Youth Olympics
Wrestlers at the 2015 European Games
Wrestlers at the 2019 European Games
European Games bronze medalists for Belarus
European Games medalists in wrestling
European Wrestling Championships medalists
Wrestlers at the 2020 Summer Olympics
Olympic wrestlers of Belarus
Sportspeople from Grodno Region
20th-century Belarusian people
21st-century Belarusian people